The warp-weighted loom is a simple and ancient form of loom in which the warp yarns hang freely from a bar, which is supported by upright poles which can be placed at a convenient slant against a wall. Bundles of warp threads are tied to hanging weights called loom weights which keep the threads taut. Evidence of the warp-weighted loom appears in the Neolithic period in central Europe.  It is depicted in artifacts of Bronze Age Greece and was common throughout Europe, remaining in use in Scandinavia into modern times. Loom weights from the Bronze Age were excavated in Miletos, a Greek city in Anatolia.

History
The warp-weighted loom may have originated in the Neolithic period.  The earliest evidence of warp-weighted looms comes from sites belonging to the Starčevo culture in modern Serbia and Hungary from late Neolithic sites in Switzerland. This loom was used in Ancient Greece, and spread north and west throughout Europe thereafter.  It was extensively used in the north among Scandinavian people. For yet unknown reasons, the warp-weighted loom diminished in popularity and disappeared from common use. The arrival of mechanized looms and industry may have contributed to this decline. It remained in use longest in Scandinavia; researcher Marta Hoffman found warp-weighted looms still in use on an isolated island off the coast of Norway and among the Sami of Norway and Finland in the 1950s. Today, the warp-weighted loom is used as a hobby and in historic preservation societies.

Use

The warp-weighted loom is used in a near-vertical position, and the fabric is woven from the top of the loom toward the ground.  This allows the weaver to walk back-and-forth while working, so that wider cloth can be woven than is practical on a ground loom.  On Ancient Greek vase paintings, two weavers, most often women, are shown working side-by-side on the warp-weighted loom.  This is unusual because most other looms require a resting position of standing or sitting. According to Artemidorus, if one dreams of a warp-weighted loom it means an upcoming journey. If one dreams of any other type of loom, one should expect rest.

Additionally, extra warp thread can be wound around the weights. When a weaver has reached the bottom of the available warp, the completed section can be rolled around the top beam, and additional lengths of warp threads can be unwound from the weights to continue. This frees the weaver from vertical size constraints.

Gallery

Notes

References

External links

 Article describing the experimental reconstruction of the 6th-7th century Anglo-Saxon warp-weighted loom from Pakenham, Suffolk.
 Anna Grostøls film about Warp-weighted loom in Nordern-Norway, del I
 Anna Grostøls film about Warp-weighted loom in Nordern-Norway, del II
 Anna Grostøls film about Warp-weighted loom in Nordern-Norway, del III
 Grenevev på Senterfornordligefolk

Weaving equipment
Ancient Greek culture